Rasikh Salam Dar (born 5 April 2000) is an Indian cricketer. In December 2018, he was bought by the Mumbai Indians in the player auction for the 2019 Indian Premier League. He became the third cricketer from Jammu and Kashmir to be picked in the Indian Premier League. At 17 years and 353 days, he became the youngest player to make their debut for the Mumbai Indians. However, in June 2019, the Board of Control for Cricket in India (BCCI) banned him for two years following a discrepancy with his birth certificate.

He made his List A debut for Jammu & Kashmir in the 2018–19 Vijay Hazare Trophy on 3 October 2018. He made his first-class debut for Jammu & Kashmir in the 2018–19 Ranji Trophy on 30 December 2018. He made his Twenty20 debut for Jammu & Kashmir in the 2018–19 Syed Mushtaq Ali Trophy on 22 February 2019. He was released by the Mumbai Indians ahead of the 2020 IPL auction. In February 2022, he was bought by the Kolkata Knight Riders in the auction for the 2022 Indian Premier League tournament.

References

External links
 

2000 births
Living people
Indian cricketers
Jammu and Kashmir cricketers
Mumbai Indians cricketers
People from Kulgam district
Kolkata Knight Riders cricketers